Named and Shamed is an album by The Flaming Stars. It was recorded and mixed by Ed Deegan at Toe Rag Studios.

Track listings
"She's Gone" – 2:40
"Where the Beautiful People Go" – 2:03
"The Marabou Shuffle" – 3:27
"Spilled Your Pint" – 3:24
"Another Dial" – 2:54
"The Parade's Gone By" – 3:37
"Stranger on the Fifth Floor" – 4:34
"If You Give 'Em a Chance" – 2:04
"Bess of the Boneyard" – 2:45
"The 39 Stops" – 2:30
"Nine Out of Ten" – 2:11
"Named & Shamed" – 3:12
"Locked in Tight" – 2:38

References

2004 albums
The Flaming Stars albums
Alternative Tentacles albums